Marquardt station is a railway station in the district of Marquardt in the city of Potsdam, Brandenburg, Germany. It is served by the line RB 21.

References

Railway stations in Brandenburg
Railway stations in Germany opened in 1937
Buildings and structures in Potsdam
Transport in Potsdam